Zahara Nakiyaga, also Zahra Nakiyaga is a beauty pageant contestant who was crowned Miss Uganda 2015 at the age of 23 years. She represented Uganda in Miss World 2015 in Sanya, China, in December 2015.

Early Life and Education Background
Nakiyaga was born to Hajjati Mariam Nabwire, a housewife, and Hajji Muhammed Kiyaga, a businessman, in Wakiso District, in the Buganda Region of Uganda, circa 1992. After attending local primary and secondary schools, she was admitted to Makerere University, Uganda's oldest and largest public university. At the time of her crowning as Miss Uganda 2015, she was in her final year of undergraduate studies at the university. Later in 2015, she graduated from the School of Liberal and Performing Arts at Makerere University, with a  Bachelor of Development Studies degree.

2015 Miss Uganda pageant
As Miss Uganda, Nakiyaga represented her country in the Miss World pageant held in Sanya, China, in December 2015.

See also
 Dora Mwima
 Leah Kalanguka
 Miss Uganda

References

External links
Here is Why Leah Kalanguka and Zahara Nakiyaga Were ‘Glaringly Absent’ in this ‘Academy of Queens’ Shoot As of 8 July 2018.

1992 births
Living people
Ganda people
Miss World 2015 delegates
Ugandan beauty pageant winners
People from Wakiso District
People from Central Region, Uganda